ELM Denmark was an environmental and sustainable development committee formed in August 1991 by a group of Danish corporations. The formation of the committee was led by Brødrene Hartmann A/S and involved the Danish National Railways, InvestMiljø, Danapak, and other key Danish companies.

References

Bibliography
 

Sustainability in Denmark
Environment of Denmark